Adcrocuta is an extinct genus of terrestrial carnivore in the family Hyaenidae that lived during the Miocene period.

References

Miocene feliforms
Miocene mammals of Africa
Miocene mammals of Asia
Prehistoric hyenas
Prehistoric carnivoran genera
Fossil taxa described in 1938